Suketsugu (written: 輔嗣 or 資次) is a masculine Japanese given name. Notable people with the name include:

 (1784–1807), Japanese kuge
 (1630–1685), Japanese daimyō

Japanese masculine given names